"Saturday Night" is a song performed by Scottish singer Sandi Thom. It was released as the second single of Thoms second album The Pink & The Lily and her fifth single overall. The song was named as "Single of the Week" by Radio 2 and received extensive airplay on the station. It was released on 25 August 2008. It is a download release for the UK market only.  A planned CD single format release was abandoned. Despite numerous promotional appearances on television, radio and press interviews the single failed to enter the UK Top 100 on its release.

Story Behind The Song
Thom said inspiration for the song came from a conversation with her manager telling her that she could not go out partying every night whilst on tour because she had to be more professional
and that the original lyrics for Saturday Night,  mentioned  drugs, but her record company insisted they were changed  before release,

Music video
There was no official music video produced.  She created a homemade video for the song.  A version of this video featuring fan photographs was mounted by Sandi's management on her official YouTube channel but it was removed by YouTube because it contained scenes of an offensive and law-breaking nature.  It has been suggested by some that this video was deliberately created to stir up controversy as a publicity stunt for the single.

References

Sandi Thom songs
2008 singles
2008 songs
RCA Records singles
Songs about nights